Dev Virahsawmy (born 1942 in Quartier-Militaire, Mauritius), is a politician, playwright, poet and advocate of the Mauritian Creole language. Though he writes easily in both French and English, Virahsawmy is most renowned for his efforts to popularize the use of Creole.

Early life
Virahsawmy spent his early childhood in Goodlands but after the death of his mother he went to live with his grandparents at Beau-Bassin. After having done his secondary education, he went to Scotland at the Edinburgh University to study languages, literature and linguistics.

Dev's father Simadree was a minister of the Labour Party who later defected to rival party MTD. Former MMM minister Jayen Cuttaree was Dev Virahsawmy's brother-in-law.

Political life
Between 1966 and 1987, he was a politician and one of the three leaders of the Mauritian Militant Movement (MMM). On 22 September 1970 he became the first member of the MMM to be elected to the National Parliament by winning the vacant seat at by-elections held in Constituency No. 5 (Pamplemousses-Triolet). These by-elections resulted from the untimely death of former attorney general Lall Jugnauth who had been duly elected in Constituency No. 5 at the 1967 General Elections under the IFB banner. 

On 23 March 1973 Dev Virahsawmy left the MMM and formed his new party Mouvement Militant Mauricien Socialiste Progressiste (MMMSP).

With the help of Peter Craig, Alan Ganoo, Alain Laridon and Showkutally Soodhun, Dev Virahsawmy founded the trade union movement called Federation Des Travailleurs Unis (FTU) to assist textile workers to bargain for higher wages and better working conditions.
 
Soon after leaving Bérenger's MMM Virahsawmy supported Anerood Jugnauth and Gaetan Duval during the 1983 elections. He became Cultural Advisor in the new MSM government, but as his passion to promote Kreol as a national language was not supported by the government, Virahsawmy left whilst Soodhun stayed within the MSM government.

Activities after leaving politics
Since leaving politics he has concentrated on playwriting. He is associated with the early protest theatre in Mauritius. Virahsawmy is married to Loga Virahsawmy, a feminist and chairperson of Gender and Media Southern Africa.

Works
Dev Virahsawmy is known for writing in Morisyen (Mauritian Creole) and translations from English and French to Morisyen.

Drama 
 Li. (préface de Dan Callikan). Rose Hill: MMMSP, 1977; (avec traduction en français de Carpanin Marimoutou, en créole réunionnais de Firmin Lacpatia). Saint-Pierre: les Chemins de la liberté, 1979.
 Bef dâ disab: pies â de ak. Rose Hill: Edisio MMMSP, 1979.
 Bef dâ disab. (édition trilingue). Saint-Denis: Mouvement culturel réunionnais, 1980.
 Linconsing finalay: pies â III ak. Rose Hill: Edisiô Bukié bananié, 1980.
 Trazedi Sir Kutta-Gram: ên badinaz futâ. Rose Hill: Bukié Banané, 1980.
 Zeneral Makbef: pies â III ak. (inspiré par Macbeth, de William Shakespeare). Rose Hill: Bukié Banané, 1981.
 Dropadi: teks pu ên trazi-komedi mizikal bazé lor Mahabharata. Rose Hill: Bukié Banané, 1982.
 Tâtin Madok: pies â ên ak. Maurice: [s.n.], 1983.
 Krishna. (Pièce télévisuelle, montée par la MBC, station nationale). Rose Hill, 1983.
 Zistwar Bisma: Komedi mizikal pu zâfâ. Rose Hill: 1984.
 Dokter Nipat: pies â III ak. (préface en français par Daniel Baggioni). Port-Louis: Bukié Banané, 1983.
 Profeser Madli: pies â III ak. Rose Hill: [D. Virahsawmy], 1984.
 Sir Toby.Port Louis: LPT, 1998.
 Abs Lemanifik: ên fâtezi â III ak. (préface en français de Daniel Baggioni). Rose Hill: Bukié Banané, 1985.
 Toufann: enn fantezi entrwa ak. Rose Hill: Boukié Banané, 1991.
 Galileo Gonaz: piess an trwa ak. Port-Louis: Ledikasyon pu Travayer, 1996.
 Dokter Hamlet. Rose Hill: Boukié Banané (site web), 1996.
 Hamlet II. Rose Hill: Boukié Banané (site web), 1996.
 Mamzel Zann. Rose Hill: Boukié Banané (site web), 1997.
 Ziliet ek so Romeo. Rose Hill: Boukié Banané (site web), 1998.
 Ti-Marie. Rose Hill: Boukié Banané (site web), 1998.
 Dernie vol. Rose Hill: Boukié Banané (site web), 2003.
 Tabisman Lir. Rose Hill: Boukié Banané (site web), 2003.
 Bistop. Rose Hill: Boukié Banané (site web), 2003.

Poetry 
 Disik salé. (préface de D. Callikan). Rose Hill: MMMSP, 1977.
 Lafime dâ lizie. Rose Hill: MMMSP, 1977; Lafime dâ lizie / Fimé dann zié / Fumées dans les yeux. (édition trilingue: créole mauricien, français, créole réunionnais). La Réunion: les Chemins de la liberté, 1979.
 Lès lapo kabri gazuyé. (texte en Bhojpuri, version française de Carpanin Marimoutou, version créole réunionnaise de Firmin Lacpatia). Saint-Pierre: Mouvement culturel réunionnais, 1980.
 Trip séré lagorz amaré. (édition trilingue). Saint-Denis: Mouvement culturel réunionnais, 1980.
 Mo Rapel. Rose Hill: Bukié Banané, 1980.
 Lôbraz lavi: solely feneâ. (préface de Jaynarain Meetoo. Rose Hill: Bukié Banané, 1981.
 Twa ek mwa. Rose Hill: 1983–1984.
 Poem pu zâfâ. Rose Hill: 1983–1984.
 Abs lemanifik: ên fâtezi â III ak. (préface en français de Daniel Baggioni). Rose Hill: Bukié Banané, 1985.
 The Walls. (trilingue). Rose Hill: D. Virahsawmy, 1985;The Walls: an operatic poem. (version en anglais) Rose Hill: Bukié Banané, 1985.
 Nwar, Nwar, Nwar, do Mama. Rose Hill: Bukié Banané, 1986.
 Lalang peyna lezo. Rose Hill: [D. Virahsawmy], 1991.
 Petal ek pikan parsi-parla. Port-Louis: Ledikasyon pu Travayer, 1996.
 Latchizann pou letan lapli. Port-Louis: Ledikasyon pu Travayer, 1997.
 Testaman enn metschiss. Port-Louis: Boukié Banané, 1999.
 Labouzi dan labriz. (In kaye literer). Port-Louis: Boukié Banané, 2002.

Prose

Novels 
Souiv Larout Ziska… Rose Hill: Boukié Banané (site web), 2002.

Essays 
 Towards a re-evaluation of Mauritian Creole. Post-Graduate Diploma Dissertation (Applied Linguistics). Edinburgh University, 1967.

Articles 
 Literesi an Morisien. Boukié Banané, 2001.
 Aprann Lir ek Ekrir Morisien. Livre electronique. Librairie Le Cygne, 2004.

Translations and adaptations by Dev Virahsawmy

in Morisien 
 Enn ta senn dan vid (Much Ado About Nothing), de William Shakespeare. Port-Louis: Ledikasyon pu Travayer, 1995.
 Zil Sezar, de William Shakespeare.
 Trazedi Makbes, de William Shakespeare.
 Tartif Froder, de Molière. Port Louis: Boukié Banané, 1999.
 Zistoir Ti-Prins, d’Antoine de Saint-Exupéry.
 Ti-Pier Dezorder (Der Struwwelpeter), de Heinrich Hoffman.

Translations

In English 
 The Prisoner of Conscience (Li). Trad. Ramesh Ramdoyal. Moka, Mauritius: Éditions de l’Océan indien, 1982.
 Toufann: A Mauritian Fantasy. Trans. Nisha and Michael Walling. African Theatre: Playwrights and Politics. Eds. Martin Banham, James Gibbs, & Femi Osofisan. Oxford: James Currey and Indianapolis: Indiana University Press. 1999: 217–54.
 Dernie Vol / The Last Flight. Trad. Joyce Fortuné-Pope. International Journal of Francophone Studies 13.3-4 (2010): 595–612.

in French 
 Toufann; une fantaisie en trois actes. Trad. Dominique Tranquille. (postface de Françoise Lionnet) Port Louis: Educational Production Ltd., 2004.

Influence
Some of the lyrics of Ziskakan are from early poems by Virahsawmy.

References

1942 births
Living people
Mauritian people of Indian descent
20th-century Mauritian writers
Mauritian dramatists and playwrights
Mauritian Militant Movement politicians
Mauritian poets
21st-century Mauritian writers
Mauritian translators
Mauritian Creole-language writers
Translators to Mauritian Creole
Alumni of the University of Edinburgh